Campiglossa hofferi is a species of tephritid or fruit flies in the genus Campiglossa of the family Tephritidae.

Distribution
Algeria.

References

Tephritinae
Insects described in 1976
Diptera of Africa